Stenocercus pectinatus is a species of lizard of the Tropiduridae family. It is found in  Argentina.

References

Stenocercus
Reptiles described in 1835
Endemic fauna of Argentina
Reptiles of Argentina
Taxa named by André Marie Constant Duméril
Taxa named by Gabriel Bibron